Roger C. Mosby is the President, CEO, and 14th Chief Scout Executive of the Boy Scouts of America (BSA), having succeeded the retiring Michael B. Surbaugh on December 29, 2019.  He was previously Vice President of Human Resources for Kinder Morgan. Born in Cape Girardeau, Missouri, his parents and family moved to Union County, Illinois where he attended elementary and high school. He graduated from Shawnee High School in Wolf Lake, Illinois, going on to Southeast Missouri State University earning a Bachelor of Science in 1973.

Background
Bucking practice, the Boy Scouts of America selected Mosby, not a professional Scouter, as their president and CEO. He did not bear the title of Chief Scout Executive initially as that title is reserved for commissioned professional Scouters with specific training. At the National Executive Board meeting in May 2021, the board commissioned Mosby, designating him as the 14th Chief Scout Executive of the Boy Scouts of America. Though not a Scouting professional, Mosby was a youth member in the Southeast Missouri Council (Cape Girardeau, Missouri) and Egyptian Council (Union County, Illinois), a long-time volunteer in the Mid-America and Sam Houston Area councils. Mosby has also worked at the regional and national levels of the BSA. He has also volunteered with the World Organization of the Scout Movement.

Before his selection as president and CEO, he ran his own consulting firm after retiring as an energy industry executive.

Awards
Mosby has been recognized with the following awards: Bronze Wolf Award (the highest award in World Scouting), Silver Beaver Award, Silver Antelope Award, the St. George Emblem  of the National Catholic Committee on Scouting, and the Vigil Honor of the Order of the Arrow.

References

External links 
 
 
 

Southeast Missouri State University alumni
Living people
1951 births
People from Cape Girardeau, Missouri
People from Union County, Illinois
Chief Scout Executives
Recipients of the Bronze Wolf Award